Perichora is a village in the municipality of Tyrnavos. The 2011 census recorded 32 inhabitants in the village. Perichora is a part of the community of Tyrnavos.

Population
According to the 2011 census, the population of the settlement of Perichora was 32 people, a decrease of almost 70% compared with the population of the previous census of 2001.

See also
 List of settlements in the Larissa regional unit

References

Populated places in Larissa (regional unit)